Morské oko (called Veľké Vihorlatské jazero in the past; literally "Sea Eye") is a lake in the Vihorlat Mountains in eastern Slovakia. It is the largest non karst lake and the third biggest natural lake in Slovakia. It is at an altitude of 618 m, covers 0.13 km² with a maximum depth of 25.1 m. It is drained by the river Okna.

The oldest known description of the lake can be found on two maps, dating back to 1687. The earliest official name of the lake known as Blatné jazero (germ. Blatto teich) dates back to 1784. The name Veľké Vihorlatské jazero was introduced in 1933.

The lake itself is natural home of 8 kinds of fish. However, the natural species are just brown trout (Salmo trutta m. fario), common minnow (Phoxinus phoxinus) and stone loach (Barbatula barbatula). In the past there was set rainbow trout (Oncorhynchus mykiss), today the prevailing species is common chub (Squalius cephalus).

It is a national nature reserve (covering 1.08 km²) since 1984 and part of the Vihorlat Protected Landscape Area.

Gallery

See also 

 Protected areas of Slovakia

External links 
 National nature reserve Morské Oko at the State Inventory of Specially Protected Parts of Nature and Landscape
 Morské oko - Sirava.net  
 Morské oko at Sirava.sk (many pictures) 

Lakes of Slovakia
Protected areas of Slovakia
Geography of Prešov Region
Tourist attractions in Prešov Region